The Myanmar International is an international badminton tournament held in Yangon, Myanmar. This tournament was established in 1999 as Asian Satellite event but did not held again until 2019, and now part of the Badminton Asia Circuit.

Past winners

Performances by countries

References 

Badminton tournaments in Myanmar
1999 establishments in Myanmar